Assem Afifi (born 3 January 1947) is an Egyptian chess International Master (1985).

Chess career
From the early 1980s to the mid-1990s, Assem Afifi was one of Egypt's leading chess players.

Assem Afifi has participated two times in Interzonal Tournaments of the World Chess Championships:
 In 1985 in Tunis ranked 16th place;
 In 1990 in Manila shared 60th - 63rd place.

Assem Afifi played for Egypt in the Chess Olympiads:
 In 1980, at fourth board in the 24th Chess Olympiad in La Valletta (+6, =5, -3),
 In 1982, at first board in the 25th Chess Olympiad in Lucerne (+5, =3, -5),
 In 1984, at first board in the 26th Chess Olympiad in Thessaloniki (+6, =3, -2),
 In 1986, at first board in the 27th Chess Olympiad in Dubai (+6, =2, -3),
 In 1988, at first board in the 28th Chess Olympiad in Thessaloniki (+5, =4, -2),
 In 1990, at first board in the 29th Chess Olympiad in Novi Sad (+2, =5, -3),
 In 1992, at third board in the 30th Chess Olympiad in Manila (+2, =6, -2),

Assem Afifi played for Africa in the World Team Chess Championships:
 In 1985, at first board in the 1st World Team Chess Championship in Lucerne (+0, =2, -7),
 In 1989, at first board in the 2nd World Team Chess Championship in Lucerne (+0, =2, -2).

Assem Afifi played for Egypt in the African Team Chess Championship:
 In 1993, at second board in the 1st African Team Chess Championship in Cairo (+1, =3, -1) and won team silver medal.

Assem Afifi was awarded the Chess International Master (IM) title in 1985.

References

External links

Assem Afifi chess games at 365Chess.com

1947 births
Living people
Egyptian chess players
Chess International Masters
Chess Olympiad competitors